Mount Bretherton is a  mountain summit located in the Olympic Mountains, in Jefferson County of Washington state. It is situated within Olympic National Park, immediately south and 1,400 feet above the shore of Upper Lena Lake. Mount Lena lies across the lake to the north, Mount Stone is 2.8 miles to the west-southwest, and The Brothers approximately four miles to the northeast. Precipitation runoff from the mountain drains south to the Hamma Hamma River via Boulder, Delta, and Lena Creeks. The non-technical ascent of Mount Bretherton involves hiking eight miles (one-way) and 5,300 feet elevation gain via the Upper Lena Lake Trail and cross-country above the lake, with most favorable conditions from July through September. There are pleasant campsites at the lake, and the ascent to the summit takes two hours from the lake. This mountain's name has been officially adopted by the United States Board on Geographic Names.

Etymology

The mountain was named in 1890 for Bernard Joseph Bretherton (1861–1903), a naturalist who was a member of the Olympic Mountains Exploring Expedition of 1890 led by Lieutenant Joseph P. O'Neil which crossed the range from east to west. He was born in England, emigrated to the United States in 1885, where he lived in Portland, Oregon, and was the curator of the Oregon Alpine Club, of which O'Neil was club secretary. Bretherton was one of three members of the O'Neil expedition who reportedly made the first ascent of Mount Olympus on September 22, although it is now believed they probably climbed a subsidiary peak named Athena. Bretherton became a US citizen in 1891, and died from tuberculosis in 1903 at age 42.

Climate
Mount Bretherton is located in the marine west coast climate zone of western North America. Most weather fronts originate in the Pacific Ocean, and travel northeast toward the Olympic Mountains. As fronts approach, they are forced upward by the peaks of the Olympic Range, causing them to drop their moisture in the form of rain or snowfall (Orographic lift). As a result, the Olympics experience high precipitation, especially during the winter months. During winter months, weather is usually cloudy, but, due to high pressure systems over the Pacific Ocean that intensify during summer months, there is often little or no cloud cover during the summer. Because of maritime influence, snow tends to be wet and heavy, resulting in avalanche danger. The months June through September offer the most favorable weather for visiting.

Geology

The Olympic Mountains are composed of obducted clastic wedge material and oceanic crust, primarily Eocene sandstone, turbidite, and basaltic oceanic crust. The mountains were sculpted during the Pleistocene era by erosion and glaciers advancing and retreating multiple times.

See also

 Geology of the Pacific Northwest

References

External links
 Weather forecast: Mount Bretherton
 Bernard Joseph Bretherton biography: Findagrave.com
 Olympic Exploring Expedition: Historylink.org

Olympic Mountains
Landforms of Jefferson County, Washington
Mountains of Washington (state)
North American 1000 m summits
Olympic National Park
Landforms of Olympic National Park